The men's discus F35/36 event at the 2008 Summer Paralympics took place at the Beijing National Stadium on 11 September. There was a single round of competition; after the first three throws, only the top eight had 3 further throws.

References

Athletics at the 2008 Summer Paralympics